Brian M. Sullivan is a New Hampshire politician.

Education
Sullivan earned a B.S. in biology from Northland College.

Career
On November 7, 2017, Sullivan was elected to the New Hampshire House of Representatives in a special election after the resignation of Andy Schmidt. Sullivan represents the Sullivan 1 district. Sullivan assumed office in 2017. Sullivan is a Democrat.

Personal life
Sullivan resides in Grantham, New Hampshire. Sullivan is married and has three children.

References

Living people
People from Grantham, New Hampshire
Northland College (Wisconsin) alumni
Democratic Party members of the New Hampshire House of Representatives
21st-century American politicians
Year of birth missing (living people)